The Villages is a census-designated place (CDP) in Sumter and Marion counties, Florida, United States. It shares its name with a broader master-planned age-restricted community that spreads into portions of Lake County. As of the 2020 census, the population of the CDP was 79,077.

The Villages covers an area of approximately 32 square miles, an area larger than Manhattan, and is expanding mainly to the south of the current community. It is made up of 17 special purpose community development districts (CDD), which are controlled by a board of supervisors (BoS), five individuals elected by the landowners of the district. H. Gary Morse, the original owner's son, transferred most direct ownership in the company to his three children in 2006; Morse died in 2014.

The community is the center of The Villages metropolitan area, which consists of all of Sumter County and is included in the Orlando–Lakeland–Deltona combined statistical area; and Marion County is included in the Ocala, Florida Metropolitan Statistical Area. Between 2010 and 2020, The Villages metropolitan area was the fastest-growing metro area in the United States, growing 39 percent, from about 93,000 in 2010 to 130,000 in 2020.

History 
Harold Schwartz, a Michigan businessman, began selling land tracts via mail order in The Villages area in the 1960s. He and his business partner, Al Tarrson, were forced to close this aspect of the business following the implementation of a 1968 federal law banning real estate sales by mail order.

Stuck with considerable portions of Florida land, in the early 1970s, Schwartz and Tarrson began the development of a mobile home park, Orange Blossom Gardens, in the northwestern corner of Lake County. By the early 1980s, the community had sold only 400 units. Schwartz bought out Tarrson's interest in improving the business and brought his son, H. Gary Morse, on board in 1983.

Morse noted that the thriving retirement communities (such as Del Webb's Sun City developments) offered numerous well-maintained amenities to the residents. They also had diverse and nearby commercial development. Morse began to upgrade the development significantly. Their sales improved in the mid-1980s. Schwartz began to buy large tracts of land in nearby Sumter and Marion counties for future expansion. In 1992, Morse officially changed the overall development name to The Villages. The development is still controlled in all significant aspects by descendants of Schwartz and Morse.

By the early 1990s, The Villages had more than 8,000 residents, three golf courses, the first Winn Dixie supermarket opened, just four restaurants, and nightly dances were held in a tent.

Expansion
In January 2017, the Holding Company of the Villages announced the purchase of 8,000 acres of land south of Florida State Road 44 in and around the villages of Southern Oaks and Fenney. In the spring of 2017, The Villages announced a planned acquisition of 2,600 acres north and south of County Road 470 along the east side of Florida's Turnpike for future development. The deal has passed due diligence by the Leesburg City Commission, and zoning ordinance changes were approved by the Leesburg Planning Commission (with the city commission giving final approval). The initial plans call for the building of approximately 4,500 homes with some commercial development also being planned.

According to data from RCLCO Real Estate, the Holding Company of the Villages sold 2,231 homes in 2017, a 13% increase over 2016. The Villages was the top-selling master-planned community in the United States in 2017 and one of only four communities to sell more than 1,000 homes.

The Villages also claimed the title of the best-selling master-planned community of the decade, with 24,440 new home sales from 2010 through 2019.

In January 2022, RCLCO Real Estate Advisors named The Villages the top-selling planned community for the ninth consecutive year, with 4,004 new homes sold in 2021, an increase of 63 percent over 2020.

Structure
A declaration of restrictions has been created for each neighborhood, which regulates the design and operational aspects, such as landscaping, repairs and maintenance, placement of satellite dishes, hedges, etc. An architectural review committee controls the composition and consistency of the exterior of the residential properties within The Villages. The committee, which consists of Villages residents, reviews and approves alterations and modifications to the properties and homes built by the developer. Committee members serve for three years and are selected by the sitting committee.

To qualify for an exception to the Housing for Older Persons Act prohibitions against discrimination, at least 80 percent of the homes within The Villages must have at least one person 55 years of age or older residing in the home. Persons under the age of 19 years are not permitted to reside within The Villages unless an exemption is granted. Three subdivisions have been designated as family units, and are not subject to this restriction. Otherwise, persons under 19 (such as grandchildren) can visit for up to 30 days within a calendar year.

Geography
It is bordered to the west and south by the city of Wildwood in Sumter County and to the east by the town of Lady Lake and city of Fruitland Park in Lake County.

Demographics

As of the census estimate of July 1, 2016, 123,966 people and 49,362 households residing in the CDP (Sumter County), the population per square mile in 2010 was 170.8. There were 68,199 housing units as of 2010.

The racial makeup of The Villages CDP was 98% White, 0.4% African American, 0.1% Native American, 0.9% Asian, 0.1% Pacific Islander, and 0.5% from two or more races. Hispanics or Latinos of any race made up 1.2% of the population.

As of 2019, persons under 5 years accounted for .1% of the population, persons under 18 years accounted for .8%, persons 65 years and over accounted for 81.6%, and 53.6% of the population was female. Median household income in 2019 was $63,841.

In 2018, the median age for both sexes in The Villages metropolitan statistical area is 67.4, with this being 29 years older than a typical American and five years older than the median age of residents in the next-oldest county in the United States, which is on the Hawaiian island of Molokai.

The Villages is the home of the largest veteran population anywhere in the United States that does not have a military base, with 16.3 percent of the population former military.

The Villages was ranked number 53 in the Forbes 2017 list of The Best Small Places For Businesses And Careers.

Circa 2014, large groups of residents are from the Midwest and Northeast, with Staten Island supplying many of the residents.

Home ownership
According to the data from the Consumer Financial Protection Bureau, women purchased 468 homes while men bought 406; this means approved mortgages for women as a percentage of approved mortgages for men was 115%, making The Villages the highest rate of the 400 metropolitan areas in the United States.

According to a November 2021 article on Realtor.com, the average down payment on a home in The Villages is 27.1 percent, which is the highest in the U.S., and the median home list price is $366,950.

Crime
According to an investigative report by WFTV News in Orlando, crime in The Villages is low and usually imported from other areas outside the community. The report stated that property crime and crimes of opportunity are approximately one-third lower than the average for the state of Florida. According to federal statistics, the statistics for violent crimes in The Villages area is half the state average. The Villages are just about average for driving under the influence charges as any similar-sized place in Florida.

Politics
The Villages has been a popular election stop and platform for Republican political figures, such as former vice president Dick Cheney, former presidential and vice presidential candidates Mitt Romney and Paul Ryan, former vice presidential candidate Sarah Palin, former presidential candidate Mike Huckabee, 2016 GOP presidential primary candidates Marco Rubio and Ben Carson, former presidential candidate Rick Santorum, and talk show hosts/authors Glenn Beck and Brian Kilmeade. In the lead-up to the 2016 presidential election, GOP vice presidential nominee Mike Pence visited to campaign for his running mate, Donald Trump.

Presidential and vice presidential visits
In October 2004, George W. Bush became the first president to visit The Villages with a rally in the new Lake Sumter Landing Market Square with approximately 20,000 supporters. The visit was less than two weeks before the 2004 United States presidential election while Bush sought to be elected to a second term.

A White House official announced that President Trump would be visiting the Sharon L. Morse Performing Arts Center on August 6, 2019, to speak about Medicare at an invitation-only event. Due to the separate mass shootings in El Paso, Texas, and in Dayton, Ohio, Trump postponed the visit.

On October 4, 2019, Trump touched down at Ocala International Airport aboard Air Force One. He briefly greeted officials and supporters before boarding Marine One and flying to The Villages Polo Club. From there, Trump traveled via motorcade to the Sharon L. Morse Performing Arts Center where he delivered an hour-long speech about expanding Medicare eligibility to an invitation-only audience of roughly 1,000 supporters. A live video feed of the event was broadcast to crowds in Spanish Springs Town Square. Trump was the second sitting president to visit The Villages. During his visit to The Villages, Trump said, "I'm thrilled to be here, one of the most famous and thriving communities anywhere in Florida, and really anywhere in the world as far as I'm concerned." At the close of the event, Trump signed an executive order to expand private insurance options for seniors under Medicare.

On October 10, 2020, Vice President Mike Pence spoke before a crowd of approximately 1,100 supporters in Brownwood Paddock Square. Topics covered by Pence included support for veterans, the economy and job creation, the administration's response to the COVID-19 pandemic, and NASA funding.

On October 23, 2020, Trump visited The Villages appearing with Governor Ron DeSantis and former Florida attorney general Pam Bondi. After arriving by helicopter on Marine One, he appeared before approximately 10,000 supporters in a field behind The Villages Polo Club. During the speech, Trump said he loved The Villages and joked about moving to the community. Trump became the first sitting U.S. president to visit The Villages twice.

Business

As of 2016, The Villages built 5.7 million square feet of commercial business space, with another 3.3 million square feet planned for the near future. Major businesses include restaurants, retail geared toward older Americans, and healthcare providers. The average commercial occupancy rate in The Villages is approximately 97 percent.

Commercial areas in The Villages include town centers, regional shopping centers, and neighborhood retail plazas. The main business areas are the 500,000-square-foot town centers that feature a mixture of retailers, restaurants, entertainment, and service providers. The Villages has a total of 14 grocery stores including seven Publix, three Winn-Dixie locations, The Fresh Market, Target, Walmart Supercenter, and a Walmart Neighborhood Market. Citizens First Bank, a community bank headquartered in The Villages, has nine locations throughout the community.

In the ten years from 2007 to 2017, The Villages metropolitan statistical area (MSA) was the 9th fastest growing area in the  United States, with the GDP growing 51.4% to $2.1 billion. According to state and federal jobs data, between 2010 and 2018 The Villages metropolitan statistical area added 13,893 jobs.

In February 2019, WalletHub, compared the median credit scores of the residents in 2,571 cities, and The Villages scored the highest in the United States with a credit score of 806.

Government
Residents of The Villages have a historically high 80% turnout rate in elections. Republicans outnumber Democrats two-to-one.

A critical part of Central Florida's Republican party, The Villages, has been visited frequently along the campaign trail by Florida governor Rick Scott and United States senator Marco Rubio. During the 2014 Florida gubernatorial election, Scott visited The Villages on the eve of the election to rally votes. Just before the 2016 United States Senate election in Florida, Rubio stopped off at the temporary Republican Headquarters established at Lake Sumter Landing in The Villages.

The Villages is in Florida's 11th congressional district represented by Representative Daniel Webster.

State representation
The entirety of The Villages is within the boundaries of Florida Senate District 12 (represented by Republican Dennis Baxley) and is within the boundaries of Florida House of Representatives District 33 (represented by Republican Brett Hage).

County
The portion of The Villages within Lake County is within Lake County District 1.

The portion of The Villages within Marion County is within Marion County District 3.

Areas of The Villages in Sumter County are divided between Sumter County District 1, which takes areas east of Morse Boulevard, and Sumter County District 3, which takes areas west of Morse Boulevard.

Local government (Community Development Districts)
The majority of The Villages is developed and maintained using several community development districts (CDD). The CDD is a form of special purpose local government available under Florida law; around 225 communities in Florida currently use this form of government. The portion of The Villages located in Lake County is under the jurisdiction of the city of Lady Lake and is not part of any of the district CDDs, but a portion is under the larger CDDs (see below).

The Villages currently operates 17 CDDs. Thirteen of the 17 CDDs cover the various areas of The Village where residents own homes and provide and maintain the roads and transportation paths, stormwater systems and structures, underground utilities, curbs and gutters, and street lights. The costs of building and maintaining this infrastructure are paid for by annual special assessments included in the property tax bill. District residents (including landowners who have yet to build on their property) elect the District Board of Supervisors members. The current district setup is as follows:

The remaining four CDDs are:
 Village Center Community Development District (VCCDD) – located in Lake, Marion, and Sumter counties, VCCDD provides water and sewer utility services, recreation, security, fire protection, and paramedic services to the residents. The cost of operations is funded by amenity and utility fees that residents pay monthly. VCCDD also provides for the maintenance of common areas and roadways for commercial areas within its boundaries. The cost of maintenance in commercial areas is funded through commercial maintenance assessments.
 Sumter Landing Community Development District (SLCDD) – located in Sumter County, SLCDD provides recreation and security services to the residents. The cost of operations is funded by amenity fees that residents pay monthly. This CDD also provides for maintaining common areas and roadways for commercial areas within its boundaries. The cost of maintenance in commercial areas is funded through commercial maintenance assessments.
 North Sumter County Utility Dependent District (NSCUDD) – provides water, reclaimed water, and wastewater services to residents of The Villages who are north of county route 466A and south of county route 466. The NSCUDD also provides municipal solid waste disposal for the portions of Sumter County, Marion County, and the City of Fruitland Park, which is inside the boundaries of The Villages.

Unlike the residential CDDs, there are no residents within the CDD boundaries. Thus, each district's five-member Board of Supervisors is composed of the developer's employees or affiliates.

Ownership associations
There are also two homeowners associations in The Villages: The Property Owners Association (POA) and The Villages Homeowners Association (VHA).

Recreational activities

As a master-planned retirement community, The Villages offers numerous forms of recreation. Most of the costs are paid via the monthly amenities fee assessed to residents (the facilities are owned by the centralized CDDs discussed above).

Golf courses
The Villages has many golf courses located throughout the community. The ability to play "Free Golf for Life" is a key component of The Village's advertising campaigns.  , The Villages operates 56 courses with 729 holes across all courses.

The majority (42) of the courses are executive golf courses, all of which are 9-hole layouts. It is these courses at which residents of The Villages can play "free golf for life" (i.e., no greens fees) and can walk the courses for free as well; fees are charged for riding a golf cart on the courses. These courses are owned by the Villages residents and managed by the Villages Community Center Development District (VCCDD) In 2020, more than 2.5 millions of rounds of golf were played on the executive golf courses.

The remaining 13 courses are country club championship courses. Among notable course architects are Arnold Palmer and Nancy Lopez. The Orange Blossom Hills and Tierra Del Sol clubs are 18-hole layouts; the other eight are 27-hole layouts. Residents of The Villages are automatically members of these clubs; however, unlike the executive courses, residents must pay greens fees to play the courses, and the clubs charge for priority tee times. The Villages Developer owns these championship courses and, through an agreement with the VCCDD, is managed by that entity.

The Villages also operates three specialty courses, including the Fenny putt and play multi-functional facility in the Village of Fenney. This course includes a lake stocked with fish and fishing poles, a walking trail, and an area to play croquet and lawn bowling. The Marsh View Pitch & Putt is an 18-hole plus a 19th hole putting challenge. The total yardage of the course is between 1,061 and 1,247 yards. The Clifton Cove Putting Course is 2 nine hole courses.

The Villages also operates a golf instruction academy for all skill levels.

Recreation centers

In addition, The Villages operates 100 recreation centers. There are three classes of centers (the number shown are as of December 2020 and are based on the types of swimming pools offered):
 Neighborhood Centers (59; these centers offer local adult-only pools as well as bocce, horseshoe, and shuffleboard courts)
 Village Centers (29; these centers offer family pools (except for Silverlake, which has no pool), facilities with billiard meeting rooms and full kitchens, bocce, horseshoe, and shuffleboard courts, plus tennis and pickleball courts)
 Regional Centers (12; these centers offer resident-only sports pools (except for Paradise, which offers a family pool), larger venues with stages for theatrical and musical productions, and many of the same features as the village centers; all but two also operate fitness centers for which membership must be purchased)

In December 2020, the Aviary Neighborhood Recreation Center opened, making it The Villages’ 100th recreation facility and 29th recreation center.

The Villages operates 11 parks, dog parks, and fitness trails, separate from the recreation centers.

Entertainment
The Villages offers various venues for the performing arts. In April 2015, the Sharon L. Morse Performing Arts Center, a venue with over 1,000 seats, opened. The Sharon has featured various popular artists such as Frankie Avalon, Willie Nelson, The Beach Boys, Jerry Lewis, Felix Cavaliere,  Little River Band,  Bobby Rydell,  Ray Stevens,  The Spinners,  Kenny G, and Chubby Checker.  The Studio Tierra Del Sol, a black box theatre with seating for 100, opened in November 2016.

Fictitious historical markers and architectural details provide an atmosphere for the residents. Amanda Brian, author of "The Faux History of The Villages, Florida," wrote, "The Villages' faux history gives a patina of stability and continuity to a highly volatile region and stage of life." Many plaques represent the "downtown areas" as if events derived from notions of an idyllic small town in the 1800s had occurred there.  Such "American myths" feature in the designs for Brownwood, Lake Sumter Landing, and Spanish Springs.

Other activities
Beyond the golf courses and recreation centers, The Villages also operates numerous softball fields, a polo stadium (The Villages Polo Stadium), and a woodworking shop, plus the Lifelong Learning College. The newest softball complex, Soaring Eagle, opened in 2015.  The Villages offers two seventeen-lane outdoor target archery ranges, one in Paradise Park and the other named Dudley Archery Range in the Village of DeSoto, near Fenney.

Nightly activities are held in The Village's three town squares, Lake Sumter Landing's Market Square and Spanish Springs Town Square.  A third town square, Brownwood Paddock Square, opened on October 12, 2012.

Clubs
As of 2018, The Villages also offer over 2700 social clubs for residents. Some of the most popular are location focused and based upon where a resident grew up, dance clubs, genealogy clubs, singles clubs, sports clubs, Beatlemaniacs club, and gardening clubs.

Media 
The Villages is served by television channels from the Orlando market, although channels from the Tampa market also cover the area. It is also served by radio stations from both the Orlando and Gainesville/Ocala markets and by area newspapers such as the Orlando Sentinel, the Tampa Bay Times, the Leesburg Daily Commercial, and the Ocala Star-Banner.

A documentary called Some Kind of Heaven, about four residents of The Villages, was released in January 2021. The documentary The Bubble, also released in 2021, depicts life inside The Villages.

Local media
The Villages developers or their successors own and operate three media properties:
 The Villages News Network (VNN), which is aired on the local Comcast cable network.
 The Villages Daily Sun, a local newspaper with 43,610 paid subscribers.
 Radio station WVLG (640), carrying classic hits.

Public radio station WMFV (89.5) serves the area and is owned by the same group as Orlando public radio station WMFE-FM, with some variations from WMFE's master schedule.

Transportation

Highway system
The Villages development is bounded roughly by US 27/US 441 to the east, US 301 to the west, County Road 42 to the north, and County Road 468 well south of 466A with the development of several new villages, Fenney, and the Brownwood town center in that area. On December 10, 2013, The Villages of Lake-Sumter Inc. agreed to an $8 million deal to purchase Pine Ridge Dairy tract in Fruitland Park, Florida with a planned construction of 2,038 new Villages homes. Although County Road 466 previously served as the main east–west corridor, the addition of homes and facilities south of County Road 466 and in the city of Fruitland Park, Florida has turned County Road 466A into a secondary east–west corridor. Buena Vista Boulevard and Morse Boulevard serve as significant north-south corridors.

A second overpass, crossing Florida State Road 44 near Brownwood Paddock Square, is currently under construction. In August 2019, the 232-foot-long bridge was lowered in place. Construction is set to finish sometime in 2020.

Plans are in place to construct three other overpasses, one crossing Florida State Road 44 near Rohan Recreation Center, with the other two spanning Florida's Turnpike.

Public transportation
Sumter County Transit operates The Villages shuttle. They provide various weekday loops through the Villages.

The Villages developers operate a trolley-style bus tour of the community from the sales and information center at The Market Square in Lake Sumter Landing.

Until 2004, when the train was shortened to Savannah, Georgia, Amtrak's Palmetto (then on a New York - Tampa itinerary) served adjacent Wildwood. Amtrak's Thruway Motorcoach bus service stops in The Villages. The bus travels from Jacksonville to Dade City and is timed to meet arrivals and departures of the Silver Star train in Jacksonville.

Autonomous vehicles
In early 2018, The Villages was chosen for a pilot program offering autonomous taxis in the area of Lake Sumter Landing. In the early stages of the program, the vehicle will have a safety driver in the driver's seat, and later the driver will be removed, and the automobile will be monitored from a control station. The technology-rich Ford Fusion Hybrid and Chrysler Pacifica minivan taxis will be operated by Voyage Auto, a San Jose, California startup company. The Villages has a 0.5 percent stake in Voyage Auto.

The Villages became one of the first cities in the United States to offer paid taxi services using autonomous vehicles throughout the community.

Education

Primary and secondary education
The following school listings are primarily for tax base purposes only, as The Villages does not allow full-time residents under age 19 except in the three family unit neighborhoods of Bison Valley, Spring Arbor, and Oak Meadows or by exception granted for hardship cases.
 The portion of The Villages located in Marion County is zoned to Lake Weir High School of the Marion County Public Schools. There are no family unit neighborhoods in the Marion County portion of The Villages.
 The portion of The Villages located in Sumter County is zoned to Wildwood Middle High School of Sumter District Schools. There is one family unit neighborhood (Bison Valley) in the Sumter County portion of The Villages.
 The portion of The Villages located in Lake County is zoned to Leesburg High School of the Lake County Schools. Two family unit neighborhoods (Oak Meadows and Spring Arbor) are in the Lake County portion of The Villages.

Although children cannot legally reside in most neighborhoods of The Villages under most circumstances, The Villages Charter Schools is a kindergarten to 12th grade charter school in unincorporated Sumter County. Children can attend the charter school if one or both of their parents work directly for The Villages or one of its direct subcontractors or if a parent works for a business located within The Villages. Children of residents who reside in a family unit neighborhood or by granted exemption do not automatically qualify for attendance based solely on their residence.

Post-secondary education

Enrichment Academy
In the fall of 2017, The Villages launched The Enrichment Academy with more than 140 fee-based, lifelong learning, noncredit courses on topics such as scuba diving, literature, philosophy and psychology, culinary arts, technology, foreign language, photography, and more. The academy is part of the Recreation and Parks Department and takes place at designated Recreation locations and other approved sites throughout The Villages.

Continuing education in the area
Sumter District Schools operates the Sumter County Adult Community Education Center in unincorporated Sumter County.

For residents of Lake and Sumter counties, Lake-Sumter State College provides adult education at the South Lake Campus in Clermont, the Leesburg Campus in Leesburg, and the Sumter Campus in unincorporated Sumter County.

College of Central Florida serves residents of Marion County, operating the Ocala Campus and the Hampton Center in Ocala in Marion County and centers and campuses in adjacent counties.

Annual events
 Each year, in April, The Villages host The Senior Games, where approximately 2,000 residents compete in hundreds of athletic events. The top five athletes in each age division who win in the Villages are invited to compete in the Florida Senior Games. The games have taken place in The Villages for 18 years and include track and field, tennis, basketball, bowling, volleyball, pickleball, fencing, clay shooting, and others.

Criticism

IRS audit of CDD bonds

In January 2008, the Village Center CDD was notified by the Internal Revenue Service of the IRS' intent to audit several recreational bonds issued in 2003 to determine compliance with tax regulations (mainly due to their status as municipal bonds which are exempt from Federal income tax). The IRS sent three "Notices of Proposed Issues" in January 2009 challenging the tax-exempt status of the bonds on three grounds:
 the Issuer does not qualify as a political subdivision or "on behalf of the issuer" of tax-exempt bonds under Section 1.103-I(b) of the Internal Revenue Code regulations,
 the opinions of value do not support the price paid by the Issuer to the developer for the Series 2003 Facilities, and the payment of the sales price for the facilities to the developer by the Issuer is not a governmental use of the proceeds of the Bonds, and
 the Bonds are private activity bonds, the interest on which is not excludable under IRS Section 103.

The position stemmed largely from the interrelationship between VCCDD and The Villages developers (since VCCDD has no residents, the Board of Supervisors consists solely of individuals who work for or are affiliated with The Villages developers, and the developers-controlled board purchased VCCDDs infrastructure from the developers). Essentially, the IRS's position is that the VCCDD is an "alter ego" for the developers.

After VCCDD rejected an IRS settlement offer, the IRS further expanded its audit in July 2009 to include all recreational and utility revenue bonds issued by VCCDD as well as similar bonds issued by Sumter Landing CDD, on the basis that Sumter Landing CDD is also an "alter ego" of the developers. However, the 10 district CDDs were not included in the expanded audit since, as shown above, the residents elect the District CDDs boards.

VCCDD opposed the position taken by the IRS. In January 2010, it formally requested technical advice from the IRS as to the position it took.  On June 14, 2011, VCCDD (after discussions with the IRS) submitted its final Request for Technical Advice, outlining its position on the matter.  In June 2013, the IRS ruled that $426 million in bonds were not tax-free since the bureaucracy running The Villages could not be considered a real government. The IRS found that the bureaucracy needed to be structured to represent the residents. On April 30, 2014, the IRS Office of Tax Exempt Bonds issued a negative response instead of The Villages requests for tax relief on the grounds of qualifying as a political subdivision under IRS regulations.

From March 2008 until October 1, 2013, it was estimated that through the Amenity Authority Committee and CDD government, Villages' residents bore approximately $750,000.00 in legal fees in defending against the IRS audit.

Faux history
The effort to present a "fanciful past" for The Villages through fictionalized plaques and building details demonstrates "the role that history plays in retirement migration." Critics have negatively compared this presentation to the approach of Disney theme parks, claiming that the plaques generally do not address ethnic minorities nor "conflict". Brian argued that "The Villages' 'history' whitewashes Florida's past and celebrates a straightforward tale of economic growth."

Notable people
 Megan Boone, American actress
 Nancy Lopez, American retired professional golfer
 Ray Knight, American former Major League Baseball player
 Tre Mann, professional basketball player

Popular culture
 Some Kind of Heaven: a 2020 documentary film about The Villages

References

External sources

 Blechman, Andrew D.  (2008).  Leisureville:  Adventures in America's retirement utopias.  New York:  Atlantic Monthly Press.
  
 Oppenheim, Lance (Director).  Some Kind of Heaven (color documentary, running time 1 hr. 21 min.).  Released January 15, 2020, in the United States.  Filmed in The Villages, Florida.  Production companies:  30WEST, Los Angeles Media Fund, Protozoa Pictures. 
 The Villages Community Development District (the website provides the public information on all 17 Community Development Districts located within The Villages area)
 

Census-designated places in Sumter County, Florida
Planned communities in Florida
Retirement communities
Census-designated places in Florida
Sumter County, Florida
Lake County, Florida
Marion County, Florida
Populated places established in the 20th century